The 1963 Armstrong 500 was the fourth running of the Armstrong 500 touring car race. It was held on 6 October 1963. After the 1962 race, the Phillip Island Grand Prix Circuit was too damaged to continue to stage the race, forcing it to move to a new location, the Mount Panorama Circuit just outside Bathurst with a new organising club, the Australian Racing Drivers Club. The race was open to standard production sedans with four classes based on the purchase price (in Australian pounds) of the vehicle.

Bob Jane and Harry Firth were the first team to complete the full race distance, taking victory in Class C in their factory backed Ford Cortina GT, the change of both vehicle and circuit making no difference to their result of the previous year. While outright victories were not to be recognised until years later, they had completed a hat-trick of 'first to the line' wins.

Class structure

The largest change was cosmetic. The bigger cars moved down the alphabet, the smaller cars moved into classes A and B. The Volkswagens moved into class A. Ford Falcons disappeared from the race, replaced by an influx of smaller, more versatile Ford Cortinas. As in 1962 the Fords were the biggest threat, shaping up to be faster than the larger D Class cars which included Chrysler Valiants and Studebaker Larks.

Class A
Class A was for cars that cost less £900. It comprised Fiat 770, Morris 850, Triumph Herald and Volkswagen Beetle.

Class B
The £901 to £1,000 class featured 1.5 litre Ford Cortina, Morris Cooper and Morris Major Elite, Renault R8 and Simca Aronde.

Class C
The £1,001 to £1,200 class was contested by Ford Cortina GT, Holden EH S4 and Holden FB.

Class D
The £1,201 to £2,000 class featured Chrysler Valiant, Ford Zephyr, Humber Super Snipe, Peugeot 404, Studebaker Lark, Vauxhall Velox and Vauxhall VX 4/90.

Race
The race became the first Ford vs Holden head-to-head fight, with the works Cortina of defending race champions Bob Jane and Harry Firth winning by a lap over the first EH Holden of Ralph Sach and Fred Morgan with a second Cortina on the same lap. It was a third consecutive victory for Jane and Firth, each victory coming in a different model and back-to-back for the factory Ford team. Second place was the closest Holden would get to a win until the breakthrough in 1968. Chrysler got its first class win with the Valiant of Tony Reynolds and Tony Allen with Geoff Russell driving the factory prepared Ford Zephyr again narrowly missing out on the Class D win. The new Morris Coopers saw the Mini break out of the entry level class and gave Doug Chivas his first class win, co-driving with Ken Wilkinson in Class B, defeating the 1.5 litre Cortinas, ominously just a lap behind the Valiant and the Zephyr. In the small class, Volkswagen again defeated the Morris 850s with Barry Ferguson and Bill Ford taking first place ahead of the Mini of Don Holland and Lindsay Little.

Results

Statistics
 Fastest Lap  – N/A
 Race time of Firth / Jane Ford Cortina GT (First car across the line)  – 7:47:14

References

External links
 Race results, www.uniquecarsandparts.com.au
 Bathurst 1963 images, autopics.com.au

Motorsport in Bathurst, New South Wales
Armstrong 500
Armstrong 500